The Journal of Strength and Conditioning Research is a monthly peer-reviewed medical journal which publishes research on aerobic conditioning, including physical strength. It was established in 1987 as the Journal of Applied Sport Science Research, obtaining its current name in 1993. It is published by Lippincott Williams & Wilkins on behalf of the National Strength and Conditioning Association, of which it is the official journal. The editor-in-chief is Nicholas A. Ratamess Jr. (The College of New Jersey). According to the Journal Citation Reports, the journal has a 2016 impact factor of 2.060, ranking it 28th out of 81 journals in the category "Sport Sciences".

References

External links

Sports medicine journals
Publications established in 1987
English-language journals
Lippincott Williams & Wilkins academic journals